Doug Pettibone (born in Los Angeles, California) is an American guitarist, singer, songwriter and studio musician.

Career
Doug Pettibone started to play the guitar at the age of eight. His first teacher was Andy Summers, formerly of The Police. With nine years, Doug studied with Eddie Lafreniere, guitarist for big band leader Jimmy Dorsey, with whom he spent the next five years studying the music of Dave Brubeck and Duke Ellington. Later he received a scholarship to Pepperdine University-Malibu for Jazz Guitar, Classical Guitar and Voice, graduating with a triple major in 1984. In the following years he played with many different artists of various genres.

In 1999, Doug started a world tour with Jewel that lasted for a year and a half. In 2001, he played pedal steel, mandolin and background vocals for Tracy Chapman's North American tour. Shortly after that, Lucinda Williams hired Pettibone as her multi-instrumentalist, singer and music director to tour, record, and co-produce. Doug´s intensive collaboration with Lucinda lasted for eight years, and continued at a later stage again. In the following years, Pettibone realized several projects with other artists. In 2004 Doug participated in the Legends Rock TV show produced in the South of France, featuring guest artists such as Sam Moore, Billy Preston and Tony Joe White. Ray LaMontagne is amongst the artist Doug went on tour with, in 2009 it was Marianne Faithfull who called him up to go on tour. After that Marianne Faithfull and Doug Pettibone started to write together new songs for a new album.

In the last few years, Pettibone has played live and/or recorded with some of the most influential artists of our times, among them Keith Richards, Norah Jones, Steve Earle, Elvis Costello, Joan Baez, Mark Knopfler, Draco Rosa, Sting, Michelle Shocked, Vic Chesnutt, Kevin Montgomery, amongst others. In 2012 he went on tour with Lisa Marie Presley, daughter of Elvis Presley. In 2013 Pettibone toured with Lucinda Williams with just the two of them on stage 
 

.

He joined John Mayer's touring band as lap steel and guitar player for the Born and Raised 2013 World Tour.

In 2016, Pettibone took part in the world tour with Zucchero; accompanied by Brian Auger on Hammond Organ.

Solo career
In October 2004, Pettibone released his first solo record The West Gate. Pettibone's second solo CD, Gone, was released in 2014.

Discography

Solo albums
 2004: The West Gate (self-released)
 2014: Gone (self-released)

Appears on
 1996: Disappear Fear - Seed in the Sahara (Rounder / Philo) - guitar
 1997: Catie Curtis - Catie Curtis (Capitol) - guitar (electric, nylon-string, gut-string)
 1997: Dave Koz - December Makes Me Feel This Way (Capitol) - guitar (electric, acoustic, bass)
 1997 Joy Lynn White - Lucky Few (Little Dog / Mercury) - guitar (acoustic, electric)
 1999: Jewel - Spirit (Atlantic) - electric guitar
 2001: Dick Sims - Within Arm's Reach (Explosive) - guitar
 2002: Alejandro Escovedo - By the Hand of the Father (Texas Music Group) - electric guitar, steel guitar, hi string guitar, slide guitar
 2002: Tim Flannery - Highway Song (PSB) - lap steel, pedal steel
 2002: Rian Greene - See Things Like You (TSR) - guitar (12 string, acoustic, electric, baritone)
 2003: Joan Baez - Dark Chords on a Big Guitar (Koch / Sanctuary) - acoustic guitar
 2003: Cindy Alexander - Smash (JamCat) - guitar, pedal steel
 2003: Vic Chesnutt - Silver Lake (New West) - arranger, guitar (12 string, acoustic, electric, tremolo), mandolin, pedal steel, vocals
 2003: Kevin Montgomery - Another Long Story (Syren) - guitar (acoustic, electric, baritone, steel), vocals
 2003: Lucinda Williams - World Without Tears (Lost Highway) - arranger, electric guitar, mandolin, vocals
 2004: Tony Furtado - These Chains (Funzal) - guitar (acoustic, electric), pedal steel
 2004: Berkley Hart - Twelve (PAN via CD Baby) - pedal steel
 2004: Jesse Malin - The Heat (Artemis) - electric guitar, pedal steel
 2004: Kevin Montgomery - 2:30am (Syren) - audio production, electric guitar, gut string guitar, producer
 2004: Waylon Payne - The Drifter (Universal) - guitar
 2004: Phil Parlapiano - Pianoforte (PBR) - vocals
 2004: Tim Flannery - Kentucky Towns (PSB) 	- electric guitar, pedal steel
 2005: Faby - Finally (Megabien Music) - guitar (acoustic, electric), vocals
 2005: Shurman - Jubilee (Vanguard) - pedal steel
 2005: Sara Evans - Feels Like Home (RCA Nashville) - electric guitar
 2005: Keith Gattis - Big City Blues (Smith Music) - pedal steel
 2005: Matthew Grimm - Dawn's Early Apocalypse (Grimm Reality Music) - vocals
 2005: Mark Knopfler - The Trawlerman's Song EP (Mercury) - electric guitar
 2005: Mark Knopfler - One Take Radio Sessions (Warner Bros.) - electric guitar, mandolin
 2005: Madrugada - The Deep End (EMI / Virgin) - pedal steel
 2005: Tom McRae - All Maps Welcome (Sony / BMG) - pedal steel
 2005: Michelle Shocked - Don't Ask, Don't Tell (Mighty Sound) - guitar, harmonica, vocals
 2005: Michelle Shocked - Mexican Standoff (Mighty Sound) - guitar, vocals
 2005: Michelle Shocked - Threesome (Mighty Sound) - guitar, vocals, harmonica
 2005: Lucinda Williams - Live at the Fillmore (Lucinda Williams album) (Lost Highway) - guitar, harmonica, lap steel, mandolin, pedal steel, vocals
 2006: Debi Derryberry - What a Way to Play (4River / Very Derryberry) - electric guitar
 2006: Tim Easton - Ammunition (New West) - electric guitar, mando-guitar
 2006: Anne McCue - Koala Motel (Messenger) - pedal steel
 2006: Molly Howson - Bar Napkin Songs (CD Baby) - guitar (acoustic, electric), lap steel, producer
 2006: Nathaniel Street-West - Witness (Puffin) - pedal steel
 2006: various artists - Rogue's Gallery: Pirate Ballads, Sea Songs, and Chanteys (Anti-) - guitar, background vocals
 2007: Debi Derryberry - Very Derryberry (4River / Very Derryberry) - guitar
 2007: Herman Mathews - Home At Last (Lil Herman) - dobro, guitar
 2007: Dave Koz - Memories of a Winter's Night (Capitol) - guitar (acoustic, electric)
 2007: Gia Ciambotti - Right as Rain (New Light) - dobro, guitar (acoustic, electric), lap steel, mandolin, pedal steel
 2007: Olivea Watson - Way Down Deep (Ramblin' Rose) - guitar (acoustic, electric, tremolo, slide), mandolin, pedal steel, vocals
 2007: The Honey Togue Devils - All Tall & The Melting Moon (CD Baby) - guitar
 2007: Lucinda Williams - West (Lost Highway) - guitar (acoustic, baritone, electric)
 2008: Austin Hartley-Leonard - Franklin Ave. (Mother West) - guitar, pedal steel
 2008: Tift Merritt - Another Country (Fantasy) - guitar, pedal steel
 2008: Gregory Page - All Make Believe (Sounden) - electric guitar, pedal steel
 2008: Lucinda Williams - Little Honey (Lost Highway) - dobro, guitar (acoustic, electric, slide, 12-string electric & acoustic) pedal steel, vocals
 2008: honeyhoney - First Rodeo (Ironworks Music / Universal Republic) - guitar
 2009: Wink Keziah - Hard Times (Great South) - electric guitar
 2009: Debi Derryberry - Debi Derryberry's Baby Banana (4River / Very Derryberry) - electric guitar, vocals
 2010: Shy Blakeman - Long Distance Man (Winding Road) - dobro, guitar (12 string, acoustic, electric)
 2010: Matt Blais - Let It Out (self-released) - guitar, lap steel, pedal steel, vocals
 2010: Chocolate Genius, Inc. - Swansongs (One Little Indian) - guitar
 2010: Mark Sholtez - The Distance Between Two Truths (Warner Music Australasia) - electric guitar, baritone guitar, mandolin, pedal steel, lap steel
 2010: Mojo Monkeys - Blessings & Curses (Medikull) - pedal steel
 2011: John Doe - Keeper (Yep Roc) - pedal ateel
 2011: David Nail - The Sound of a Million Dreams (MCA Nashville) - electric guitar
 2011: Jill Sobule and John Doe - A Day at the Pass (Pinko) - banjo, guitar, pedal steel
 2011: Marianne Faithfull - Horses and High Heels (Dramatico) - banjo, composer, guitar (acoustic, electric), pedal steel, vocals (lead, background)
 2012: Ted Wulfers - Lucky No. 7 (Patchdog) - electric guitar on "More Than A Mystery" and "Me & Miss 4th of July."
 2012: Anna Bergendahl - Something To Believe In (Lionheart) - guitar
 2012: G. DaPonte - Lucky Days and Lucky Numbers (Three Moves Equals A Fire) - electric guitar
 2013: various artists - Son of Rogues Gallery: Pirate Ballads, Sea Songs & Chanteys (Anti- / Epitaph) - guitar
 2014: Lucinda Williams - Down Where the Spirit Meets the Bone (Highway 20) - electric guitar, vocals
 2014: various artists - Looking Into You: A Tribute to Jackson Browne (Music Road) - electric guitar on track 2-2 "The Pretender"
 2015: The White Buffalo - Love And The Death Of Damnation (Unison) - pedal steel, lap steel
 2015: Todd Griffin - Mountain Man (Bad Reputation) - guitar
 2015: various artists - Remembering Mountains: Unheard Songs by Karen Dalton (Tompkins Square) - guitar on track 5, "Met An Old Friend"
 2016: various artists - God Don't Never Change: The Songs of Blind Willie Johnson (Alligator) - guitar
 2017: Shelby Lynne & Allison Moorer - Not Dark Yet (album)
 2020: Natalie D-Napoleon - You Wanted To Be The Shore But Instead You Were The Sea - guitar (electric), pedal steel, mandolin
 2013 	The Music Is You: A Tribute to John Denver 		- Guitar (Electric)
 2012  Walter Rose: Cast Your Stone - Guitar, Weissenborn, 12 string octave guitar 
 2012 	Occupy This Album 		- Guitar, Mandolin
 2012 	Quiet About It: A Tribute To Jesse Winchester 		- Guitar (Electric) 
 2009 	Porcupine 	- Tim Easton 	- Guitar
 2009 	The Great Lakes 	- Ross McIntosh 	- Banjo, Dobro, Guitar (Acoustic), Guitar (Electric), Mando-Guitar,  Vocals
 2008 	Kid Dynamite and the Common Man 	- Eric Corne 	- Dobro, Guitar (Electric), Main Personnel, Ukulele
 2008 	Let It All Come Down 	- G. DaPonte 	- Guitar, Guitar (Electric), Soloist
 2008 	The Imus Ranch Record 		- Guitar
 2007 	Boots Too Big to Fill: Tribute to Gene Autry 		- Harmony
 2007 	Goin' Home: A Tribute to Fats Domino 		- Guitar (Electric)
 2007 	Outta Nowhere 	- Tim Myers 	- Banjo, Guitar (Acoustic), Guitar (Electric), Mandolin
 2007 	Rio Rocko 	- Rio Rocko 	- Guitar (12 String Electric), Guitar (Electric)
 2005 	Return to Sin City: A Tribute to Gram Parsons 		- Guitar, Vocals
 2005 	This Is Americana, Vol. 2 		- Guitar, Harmonica, Vocals
 2004 	Por Vida: A Tribute to the Songs of Alejandro Escovedo 		- Guitar, Producer
 2004 	This Is Americana 		- Guitar (Electric), Harmony, Mandolin
 2003 	Crossing Jordan 		- Guitar (Electric)
 2003 	Martin Scorsese Presents the Blues: The Soul of a Man 		- Bass, Vocals
 2003 	Sounds of Wood and Steel, Vol. 3 		- Guitar, Primary Artist
 	Artist's Choice: Norah Jones 	- Norah Jones 	- Group Member

Filmography
   Made in America (TV series documentary)  (2003) 
   Legends Rock (music TV series)  (2004) 
  Jefferson Davis: An American President (TV documentary) (musician: guitar) (2008)

References

External links
 
 
 Doug Pettibone - Discography of CDs at cduniverse
 Doug Pettibone, member of the Legends Rock band

Living people
Singer-songwriters from California
American session musicians
Guitarists from Los Angeles
American male guitarists
Year of birth missing (living people)
American male singer-songwriters